Sphyraena helleri, the Heller's barracuda, is a schooling species of barracuda in the family Sphyraenidae.

Named in honor of zoologist Edmund Heller

Description
These fishes have six dorsal spines and two anal spines. The skinny bodies are silvery with a horizontal blue stripe and two yellowish stripes on the sides. Caudal fin is darkish. They are usually seen by day in large schools, while they hunt nocturnally.

Distribution and habitat
This species is present in the Indian Ocean (East Africa and the Mascarene Islands) and in the Pacific Ocean (north to southern Japan, south to the Coral Sea, and east to French Polynesia; Hawaiian Islands). These fishes inhabit coral reefs and bays.

References

External links
 

Sphyraenidae
Fish described in 1901